Kleiner Trauermarsch ("Little Funeral March") in C minor, K. 453a is a keyboard work composed in 1784 by Wolfgang Amadeus Mozart, written in the notebook of his student Barbara Ployer.

The piece is also called Marche funebre del Sigr Maestro Contrappunto ("Funeral March for Mr. Master Counterpoint"). It was dedicated to Barbara Ployer.

It was first published in 1930. The autograph was thought to have been lost in 1945.

External links 
 

Compositions by Wolfgang Amadeus Mozart
1784 compositions